Marawila is a town in Puttalam District, North Western Province, Sri Lanka.

It is located on the A3 highway, which connects Negombo and Chilaw. Marawila is one of the tourist attractions on  the west coast of Sri Lanka and known for its beaches.

Infrastructure

Education 

 St. Xavier's College, Marawila
 Holy Family Girls School, Marawila
 St. Mary's Boys School

Hospitals
A Type B Government Base Hospital situated in Marawila.

References

Towns in Puttalam District